Laura Larson (born 1965) is an American photographer based in Columbus, Ohio.

Life
Larson earned her BA in English from Oberlin College, her MFA in visual arts at Rutgers, State University of New Jersey and participated in the Whitney Museum of American Art Independent Study Program. She is a professor in the School of Art + Design at Ohio University.

Art career 
Larson identifies herself as a photographer, although her work includes film, video, digital media, and writing.  As part of her practice, Larson explores the assumption of photography's purported objectivity by taking documentary and poetic approaches in her work. She deals with issues related to the medium of photography, domestic spaces, her relation to female bodies, and photography's vernacular histories, among others. A recurrent topic in Larson's work is the paranormal.  In her video Electric Girls and the Invisible World, she follows a group of five teenage girlfriends and their mysterious connection to the 19th century medium Eusapia Palladino, presenting reflections on female adolescence, melancholy, and longing. Electric Girls was supported by a post-production residency for film at the Wexner Center for the Arts.

Larson's work challenges the notion of the medium that “never lies." In her “Domestic Interiors” and “My Dark Places” series, she photographs dollhouse interiors, playing with the viewer's perception of scale.

Larson's “Well-Appointed” series depicts the interior of historical homes, focusing on the lavish furniture and raising questions about wealth and power. Her series “Complementary” captured traces of occupancy in hotel rooms after checkout and before maid service. Larson used the interrelationship of First and Second Wave Feminism as a jumping off point for these four bodies of work, which center around mise en scene, and how the rooms themselves tell a story.

Two related series “Apparition” and “Asylum” focus on the paranormal. Larson created her own spirit photographs, using cigarette smoke to reference the staged spirit photographs of the 19th century.

Larson's focus shifted to the representation of the body with her series “Ectoplasm,” referencing the both humorous and moving 19th century photographs of female mediums.

Her book and curated exhibition Hidden Mother (2017) uses portraits of children with "hidden mothers," the term for the practice of concealing a mother's body as she supported her child during the long exposures demanded by early photographic technology, to present her personal experience of motherhood. As part of this project, Larson curated a traveling exhibition of her extensive collection of 19th century tintypes featuring portraits of children with "hidden mothers."

Book

Public collections
Larson's work is held in the following public collections:
Metropolitan Museum of Art, New York City
Museum of Fine Arts, Houston

References 

1965 births
Living people
Fine art photographers
Ohio University faculty
Rutgers University alumni
Artists from Ohio
20th-century American photographers
21st-century American photographers
20th-century American women photographers
21st-century American women photographers
American women academics